The Miami Strike Force were an American soccer team in Miami, Florida.

They joined the USISL PDSL as the Miami Tango in 1996 (not to be confused with the second Miami Tango), and became the Miami Breakers in the next season. They moved up to the USISL D-3 Pro League in 1998. For the 1999 season, the team was relegated back to the PDL. In 2001, the team was renamed the Miami Strike Force, and folded after that year.

The team played at Hialeah Gardens High School Stadium in Hialeah Gardens, Florida.

Year-by-year

Defunct soccer clubs in Florida
Strike Force
2001 disestablishments in Florida
1996 establishments in Florida
Association football clubs established in 1996
Association football clubs disestablished in 2001